Letfotar Airport  is an airport serving Moudjeria in Mauritania.

Airports in Mauritania